Bruce Wayne, better known by his vigilante superhero alias Batman, is a fictional character who appears as the main protagonist in Tim Burton's Batman and Batman Returns, which are part of the Batman film series (1989–1997), and later in the DC Extended Universe (DCEU) film The Flash. He is based on the DC Comics character of the same name and was originally portrayed by Michael Keaton.

This version of the character was critically acclaimed, and an influence on later interpretations. Keaton is set to reprise the role in the DCEU film The Flash (2023), which retroactively incorporates him into DCEU continuity. He was also expected to reprise the role in Batgirl before the film's cancellation.

The character was recast with Val Kilmer and George Clooney in Joel Schumacher's Batman Forever (1995) and Batman & Robin (1997) respectively. Keaton's likeness as his version of the character made a reappearance in the limited comic series Batman '89 (2021-22), which narratively continued from the events of Batman Returns while disregarding the events of Shumacher's films.

Production

Casting
Multiple actors were considered for the role of Batman during production. In Tom Mankiewicz's original script which Ghostbusters director Ivan Reitman was attached to, actor Bill Murray was considered for the role in a script that featured Eddie Murphy as Dick Grayson / Robin. Gremlins director Joe Dante was attached to the project as well at one point. The script was intended as a comedy, but was altered significantly after Tim Burton's involvement. Mel Gibson, Kevin Costner, Charlie Sheen, Tom Selleck, Harrison Ford, Pierce Brosnan, Ray Liotta, Willem Dafoe, Alec Baldwin, Patrick Swayze, Kyle MacLachlan, Steven Seagal, Dennis Quaid and Jean-Claude Van Damme were all considered for the role. Eventually, producer Jon Peters suggested Michael Keaton, claiming he had the right "edgy, tormented quality" for the role, and based his argument on Keaton's dramatic performance in the film Clean and Sober. At the time, Keaton was primarily known for comedic parts in Mr. Mom and Beetlejuice, the latter also being directed by Burton. Keaton's casting as the character caused an uproar from fans of the character, who claimed Keaton was too comedic and too short for the role. Over 50,000 recorded protest letters were sent to Warner Bros. offices, and the casting was questioned by screenwriter Sam Hamm, producer Michael Uslan and even Batman co-creator Bob Kane.

For the two later films, Keaton decided not to reprise the role of Batman and Val Kilmer (Batman Forever) and George Clooney (Batman & Robin) were cast.

Batsuits

The Batsuit worn by Keaton was designed by costume designer Bob Ringwood. Ringwood turned down the opportunity to work on James Bond film Licence to Kill to work on Batman. Ringwood stated that designing the Batsuit was difficult, claiming "the image of Batman in the comics is this huge, big six-foot-four hunk with a dimpled chin. Michael Keaton is a guy with average build. The problem was to make somebody who was average-sized and ordinary-looking into this bigger-than-life creature." Producer Jon Peters had requested for the Batsuit to feature a Nike product-placement, but was shot down by Burton and Ringwood, feeling that it would not be intimidating. 28 latex designs of the suit were made, as well as 25 different capes and 6 different heads. It was decided the use of spandex as in the comics and previous adaptations would not be intimidating enough, so the character was given black armor pieces.

The Batsuit was upgraded for Batman Returns, using more flexible foam latex, as well as a more traditional chest emblem. The updated Batsuit also featured a zipper to allow for urination in between takes and an updated plated armor torso that did not resemble sculpted muscles. Keaton still had difficulty hearing but found the neck movement much less restrictive than with the first costume. Due to the second costume's much thinner cowl with increased flexibility, a greater range of head-turning was allowed but could still leave gaps folding away from the cheek. The infamous "Bat-Turn" movement became an iconic part of the character's body language despite not truly needing to depend upon it, contrary to speculation from contemporary pundits. The wardrobe department spent seven weeks sculpting Batman Forever costumes on his body cast, preceding under the assumption that he would be returning. The addition of nipples and an enlarged codpiece to the Batsuit and Robin's costume in Batman & Robin was the subject of criticism.

Fictional character biography

Burton films and DC Extended Universe

Batman 

As a child, Wayne watches the film The Mark of Zorro with his parents, Thomas and Martha. As the Waynes walk down an alley, Thomas and Martha are shot and killed by a mugger. After this, he is raised by Alfred Pennyworth (Michael Gough), the family butler. At his parents' funeral, he runs away and discovered a cave filled with bats on the family grounds, and decides to take the image and use it to put fear into the hearts of individuals who do wrong. After decades of training, the adult Wayne had his company purchased equipment and built an advanced combat suit and the Batcave, a secret lair under Wayne Manor, and begins fighting crime in Gotham City as a vigilante who dresses as a bat.

Years later as an adult, there have been numerous sightings of the "Bat vigilante" and a criminal, Johnny Gobbs, who died after accidentally falling off from a roof, creates a rumor that the vigilante killed Gobbs in a manner of a vampire that feeds on blood and cannot be killed. The vigilante's reputation as a menacing creature of the night that hunts wrongdoers strikes fear in the city's criminal element.

Wayne hosts a fundraiser at Wayne Manor to help fund the Gotham City 200th Anniversary Parade, where he meets photographer Vicki Vale (Kim Basinger).

Wayne finds in reviewing the Manor's surveillance cameras that Commissioner James Gordon (Pat Hingle), who left the party unexpectedly, had been summoned to Axis Chemicals due to a break-in by Jack Napier (Jack Nicholson), crime lord Carl Grissom's (Jack Palance) right-hand man. Wayne suits up as the vigilante, now known as Batman, and during the fight, Napier falls into a vat of chemicals, transforming him into the insane, disfigured criminal mastermind the Joker.

On the 20th anniversary of his parents' murder, Wayne leaves lunch with Vale, and witnesses the Joker killing one of Grissom's associates. As Batman, he discovers that the Joker has poisoned various consumer products with his Joker venom. Wayne is informed by Alfred that he has a date with Vale at the Flugelheim Museum. Wayne states he has no plans to meet Vale that day, and realizes that the meeting was set up by the Joker to gain information on Batman.

After a battle with the Joker's men, Batman and Vale return to the Batcave, where he reveals his investigation of Joker's lethal chemicals to Vale, giving her his research to publish. Wayne nearly reveals to Vale that he is Batman, but they are interrupted by the Joker. The master criminal shoots Wayne, who survives because he is wearing body armor.

Wayne recognizes the Joker as the mugger who killed his parents. Wayne comes across the Joker's parade float during the 200th Anniversary Parade, where the Joker plans to kill thousands of people with his toxin. Batman foils the Joker's plan, however, and pursues him and Vale into the cathedral, eventually finding them at the top level. Batman confronts the Joker over killing his parents, and gets into brutal hand-to-hand combat with the villain. As the Joker tries to escape on a helicopter, Batman uses his grappling gun to tie one of the cathedral's gargoyles to the Joker's leg; when the gargoyle breaks free from its foundations, the Joker falls to his death. In the aftermath, Batman gives the Gotham City Police Department (GCPD) his own personalized signal as a way of contacting him for help.

Batman Returns 

During Gotham's Christmas celebrations, Batman discovers the Red Triangle Gang has interrupted the annual tree lighting ceremony. Despite managing to fight them off, he is too late to stop them taking billionaire industrialist Max Shreck (Christopher Walken) hostage. The next day, a member of the gang kidnaps the mayor's infant son, but the child is saved by the Penguin (Danny DeVito), a deformed mystery man who has lived in the sewers ever since his parents threw him into Gotham's reservoir. Though Penguin is immediately accepted by the public and allowed inside the Hall of Records to find his birth parents, Batman remains suspicious, and discovers the Penguin may have once been a performer in the Red Triangle Circus and connected to a series of missing children cases. He deduces that the Penguin is the gang's leader and is planning something else, already knowing who his parents are. Penguin becomes popular with the citizens of Gotham, and they discover his name is Oswald Cobblepot, with his parents having died years earlier. Meanwhile, Wayne meets with Shreck, who had been blackmailed into helping Oswald return to the surface, to contest his plans to build a new power plant, and meets Shreck's secretary Selina Kyle (Michelle Pfeiffer), unaware that she is the masked vigilante Catwoman, who is planning to kill Shreck as revenge for trying to kill her when she discovered that his power plant will actually drain Gotham of its energy and leave the city at the mercy of the Shreck family.

On Shreck's urging, the Penguin officially announces his plans to run for Mayor of Gotham City, and later, Wayne and Kyle discover that Cobblepot attempted to frame Batman by kidnapping the Ice Princess (Cristi Conaway), who was to relight the tree, and leaving behind a batarang. While Batman investigates the kidnapping, the Red Triangle Gang sabotages the Batmobile to allow the Penguin remote control access. Batman finds the Ice Princess standing on the edge of a rooftop, but the Penguin arrives and startles the girl by opening one of his trick-umbrellas and releasing a swarm of bats, which knocks her off the roof to her death. She lands on the button used to light the tree, causing a mass swarm of bats to attack the onlookers. Batman is forced to flee, now the chief suspect in the murder.

Batman returns to the Batmobile, but the car, having been hacked by the Penguin, takes him on a destructive joyride, though Batman is able to disable the signal and escape. With Alfred's help, Batman hacks into the Gotham Plaza's speakers during one of the Penguin's speeches and plays a recording of the villain bragging about having manipulated the entire city, causing a backlash from the crowd. At Shreck's masked ball, Kyle tells Wayne her plans to kill Shreck, and the two deduce each other's secret identities. At that moment, the Penguin crashes through the floor of the room, announcing his plans to kill all of the first-born sons of Gotham and takes Shreck hostage. Batman arrives and interrogates Penguin's right-hand man, learning of the Penguin's hideout underneath the Arctic World exhibit at the abandoned Gotham Zoo.

Batman foils the Penguin's plan to massacre Gotham by sending his penguins to fire missiles at the city and, with Pennyworth's help, reprograms the penguins to fire upon the Penguin's hideout. Batman and Penguin fight until the Penguin falls into the toxic waters in the sewer, eventually causing him to die. Batman attempts to stop Kyle from killing Shreck, and reveals his secret identity. Kyle kills Shreck by kissing him with a taser in her mouth, but mysteriously disappears. After the GCPD seize the Penguin's destroyed lair, Wayne finds Kyle's black cat, Miss Kitty, in an alleyway, implies that a very much alive Catwoman is watching him from a rooftop while the Bat Signal shines in the sky.

The Flash 

Keaton reprised his role in the DC Extended Universe (DCEU) film The Flash (2023).

Schumacher films

Batman Forever

Batman is called to stop the gangster Two-Face (Tommy Lee Jones) from destroying the Gotham Statue of Liberty, with help from Gordon and psychologist Chase Meridian (Nicole Kidman), who becomes instantly attracted to him. Two-Face was once Gotham's District Attorney, Harvey Dent, before a criminal scarred half of his face with acid, for which he blames Batman. The Dark Knight stops Two-Face from destroying the statue, but Two-Face escapes.

The next day, Bruce Wayne visits Wayne Enterprises and becomes acquainted with Edward Nygma (Jim Carrey), an employee who is obsessed with him. Nygma has developed the Box, a machine capable of transmitting television signals directly into the human brain. He asks Wayne to fund his invention, but Wayne turns him down. Seeking revenge, Nygma reinvents himself as "the Riddler" and allies himself with Two-Face in a plot to destroy both Batman and Bruce Wayne, whom Nygma has discovered are one and the same.

During a charity circus performance, Wayne witnesses Two-Face attack and murder a family of acrobats dubbed the Flying Graysons, leaving their youngest son, Dick (Chris O'Donnell), an orphan. Feeling a kinship with Dick, Wayne takes him in as his ward. Dick soon discovers Wayne's secret identity, and asks Wayne to take him on as his crimefighting partner so he can kill Two-Face and avenge his family. Wayne, who still feels responsible for his parents' deaths, refuses, not wanting to be responsible for another lost life.

Meanwhile, Wayne soon starts a romantic relationship with Meridian, who tries help him move on the trauma of his parents' deaths. Wayne decides to abandon his war on crime and lead a normal life with her. Before he can tell her, however, Riddler and Two-Face attack Wayne Manor, take Meridian hostage, and destroy the Batcave. Batman tracks the villainous duo to their hideout, with help from Dick, whom he has finally accepted as his crimefighting partner, Robin.

Two-Face and the Riddler take Meridian and Robin hostage, setting a trap that would force Batman to choose between saving one life or the other. Instead, Batman destroys the Box, driving the Riddler insane, and saves Meridan and Robin. Two-Face corners them at gunpoint, and while flipping his coin to decide their fates, Batman throws a handful of coins at him, causing him to fall to his death, avenging Dick's family.

Batman and Robin 

New villain Mr. Freeze (Arnold Schwarzenegger) surfaces and commits a string of diamond thefts, catching the attention of Batman and Robin. After Freeze freezes but spares Robin in order to escape, Wayne chastises Dick, who has begun to chafe under Wayne's leadership. Wayne deduces that Freeze is Dr. Victor Fries, whose wife, Nora, is suffering from MacGregor's syndrome and was placed in cryogenic sleep until Freeze finds a cure. In his prior research, Fries accidentally fell backwards into a tank of modified liquid nitrogen, rendering him unable to survive outside of a subzero environment. In order to lure Freeze in, Wayne hosts a charity ball auctioning off the Wayne family diamonds with himself and Dick attending as Batman and Robin, leading to an ensuing battle and Freeze's capture. Wayne and Grayson become acquainted with Dr. Pamela Isley, who is secretly the metahuman ecoterrorist Poison Ivy, and who seduces Robin and allies with Freeze, breaking him out of Arkham Asylum. Ivy then unplugs Nora's life support and convinces Freeze that Batman is responsible.

Alfred's niece Barbara Wilson (Alicia Silverstone) comes to visit Wayne Manor, at about the same time that Wayne discovers that Alfred is dying of McGregor's Syndrome. She soon discovers the Batcave, and becomes Batgirl. Batman and Robin reluctantly allow her to help them defeat Freeze and Ivy, who are trying to turn Gotham City into a giant polar ice cap with a giant freeze ray that Freeze invented. Batgirl defeats Ivy, and the three head to the observatory to stop Freeze. Robin and Batgirl defeat Ivy's minion Bane (Robert Swenson) while Batman faces and subdues Freeze, redirecting the telescope's satellites to reflect sunlight to thaw Gotham, but Freeze detonates several bombs that he had placed around the freeze ray, destroying it. Nevertheless, Robin and Batgirl are still able to thaw the city. Batman reveals to a defeated Freeze that Nora is still alive, having been rescued in time.

Batman appeals to Freeze's humanity and asks him for the cure to MacGregor's syndrome's early stages to save Pennyworth. Freeze provides him with the cure and returns to Arkham to torment Ivy, his new cellmate, while Pennyworth makes a full recovery and reunites with Wayne, Grayson, and Barbara.

Comic appearances

Film adaptations
A comic adaptation of Tim Burton's Batman titled Batman: The Official Comic Adaptation of the Warner Bros Motion Picture was released in June 1989. Longtime Batman editor at DC Dennis O'Neil adapted the screenplay, with art provided by Jerry Ordway.

A comic adaptation for Batman Returns titled Batman Returns: The Official Comic Adaptation of the Warner Bros Motion Picture was released in June 1992. The story was once again adapted by Dennis O' Neil, with pencils provided by Steve Erwin and inked embellishments by José Luis García-López. Many of the illustrations García-López did for the film's style guide were re-purposed for the comic adaptation.

Canonical comic continuation
A comic continuation that was to chronicle the events of Tim Burton's failed third Batman film titled Batman '89 was submitted to DC Comics written by Joe Quinones and Kath Leth in March 2016. The run was inspired by DC's recent comic run Batman '66, which was a continuation of the 1966 television series starring Adam West and Burt Ward. The story was to be a direct sequel to Burton's Batman films, with visual allusions to Michael Keaton as Batman, Billy Dee Williams (who portrayed a pre-disfigurement Harvey Dent in Batman) as Two-Face, Marlon Wayans as Robin, Michelle Pfeiffer as Catwoman, and Robin Williams as The Riddler. The story would also introduce iterations of Barbara Gordon, Poison Ivy and Harley Quinn into the story's fictional universe. However, the comic run was initially rejected by DC.

In February 2021, it was confirmed that DC would in fact be proceeding to develop a canonical comic continuation of Burton's Batman films, with Batman screenwriter Sam Hamm returning to write the script while Joe Quinones provides the comic's art.

In other media

Television
 Keaton's Batman was referenced in the Arrowverse television crossover event "Crisis on Infinite Earths". This series establishes the universe in which Batman (1989) and Batman Returns (1992) exist as "Earth-89", with Robert Wuhl, who portrayed Alexander Knox in Batman, reprising his role for the series for a cameo appearance. In the crossover, Bruce Wayne / Batman is mentioned as having captured the Joker (despite his apparent death) and married Selina Kyle / Catwoman.

Video games
 The suit from Tim Burton's Batman films was added as an alternate skin to Batman: Arkham Knight during a free update in August 2015.

Reception and legacy
Michael Keaton's portrayal as Batman was seen as hugely influential towards further adaptations of the character. Keaton's portrayal inspired the portrayal by Kevin Conroy in Batman: The Animated Series. As the first version of the character to carry a grapple device with a motorized reel, as well a cape that can harden and transform into a hang-glider, these concepts would become highly influential for most contemporary appearances of the character. Keaton's grim, monosyllabic persona in-costume has been paid tribute to throughout multiple adaptations of the character, including video game appearances and homages.

This adaptation of the character was also seen as the first to change their voice while in costume as Batman, something which future actors Kevin Conroy, Ben Affleck and Christian Bale would also add to their interpretations. Michael Keaton's portrayal of the character appears on AFI's 100 Years...100 Heroes & Villains at #46 on the heroes side, while Jack Nicholson's portrayal as the Joker ranked 45th on the villains side.

Birdman comparisons

Due to his involvement in the film, Michael Keaton's role in the film Birdman directed by Alejandro G. Iñárritu has been compared to Keaton's own experiences as Batman. Many people have come to the conclusion that the film is a reflection of Michael Keaton's life post-Batman, as the film itself focuses on Riggan Thompson, a struggling, aging actor who is best known for having played a winged superhero earlier in his career.

When Iñárritu contacted Keaton about taking the role of Riggan, Keaton asked him if he was making fun of him for playing Batman. Despite comparisons between Riggan and Keaton and many people believing that the role was taken by the actor to let out frustration at the role, Keaton has claimed that he loves talking about his time as Batman, and is extremely grateful for the role.

Keaton was nominated for the Academy Award for Best Actor for his performance in Birdman, his first-ever nomination, and this was what helped him gain the villainous role of Adrian Toomes / Vulture in Spider-Man: Homecoming (2017) and Morbius (2022), which are respectively set in the Marvel Cinematic Universe (MCU) and Sony's Spider-Man Universe (SSU).

See also
Bruce Wayne (Dark Knight trilogy)
Bruce Wayne (DC Extended Universe)

References

External links

Action film characters
Alternative versions of Batman
Batman (1989 film series)
Batman in other media
Batman live-action film characters
Characters created by Tim Burton
DC Comics superheroes
DC Comics male superheroes
DC Extended Universe characters
Fictional aviators
Fictional blade and dart throwers
Fictional business executives
Fictional hackers
Fictional philanthropists
Fictional socialites
Fictional vigilantes
Film characters introduced in 1989
Male characters in film
Orphan characters in film
Superheroes with alter egos